The Birth of Venus  (French: Naissance de Venus) is a painting by the French artist Alexandre Cabanel. It was painted in 1863, and is now in the Musée d'Orsay in Paris. A second and smaller version (85 x 135.9 cm) from ca. 1864 is in Dahesh Museum of Art. A third (106 x 182.6 cm) version dates from 1875; it is in the Metropolitan Museum of Art in New York City.

Shown to great success at the Paris Salon of 1863, The Birth of Venus was immediately purchased by Napoleon III for his own personal collection. That same year Cabanel was made a professor of the Ecole des Beaux-Arts.

Cabanel's combination of sensual and classical imagery appealed to the higher levels of society. Art historian and curator Robert Rosenblum wrote of Cabanel's The Birth of Venus that "This Venus hovers somewhere between an ancient deity and a modern dream"; he described "the ambiguity of her eyes, that seem to be closed but that a close look reveals that she is awake ...  A nude who could be asleep or awake is specially formidable for a male viewer."

Background and description
At the Salon of 1863, The Birth of Venus was one of a multitude of female nudes. Bathed in opalescent colors, the goddess Venus shyly looks to the viewer from beneath the crook of her elbow. Two years later, Manet presented his now renowned painting Olympia at the Salon as well. Today both hang in the Musee’d’ Orsay. Unlike Venus's ethereal-like palette, Manet painted Olympia with pale, placid skin tone, and darkly outlined the figure. Her only seemingly modest gesture is her placement of her hand over her leg, though it is not out of shyness- one must pay before they can see. James Rubin writes of the two works: “The Olympia is often compared to Cabanel’s Birth of Venus, for the latter is a far more sexually appealing work, despite its mythological guise… It is evident Manet’s demythologizing of the female nude was foremost a timely reminder of modern realities."
 
Cabanel depicts personality, but in subtle ways through her relaxed posture and sleepy expression. Jenna-Marie Newberry writes of Venus: “The lightest of color used in The Birth of Venus alludes to the lightness and enlightenment of relaxation, amplifying the reclining nude’s placid demeanor and virginity. The contrapposto twist of the figure with the melodramatic swoop of the arm over the face comes directly from his previous paintings … Venus herself takes over the entire front of the picture plane. Her hair has been deepened, adding more to her allure and purity.” It is as if the viewer is catching a glimpse of a goddess simply basking in the nature that enfolds her. She is a part of her surroundings and the viewer is privy to behold upon the scene. Cabanel produced a quite seductive painting of a mythological beauty in a way that appealed to viewers at the time of its creation. Following the Salon it was said: “His dark-eyed heroines, thinly painted, usually in muted colors and immaculately drawn, were popular on both sides of the Atlantic”.
 
Over time, Cabanel developed what would become his signature style. It was his attention to detail that made him popular in the nineteenth century. Cabanel was schooled at the Ecole des Beaux Arts under the painter François-Edouard Picot. Following his tutelage, he entered his first Salon in 1843 and won second place in the Prix de Rome in 1845. “Several major decorative commissions followed including the ceiling in the Cabinet des Dessins in the Louvre, and are typical of Cabanel’s talent for achieving sumptuous effects.” Initially famous for his mythological paintings, Cabanel also made a name for himself in Europe and abroad through his portraits. “Praised as a portraitist of women, Cabanel expressed that he was particularly adept at painting portraits of American women.”

A portrait by Cabanel was a desirable commodity. He was a favored portraitist of the Emperor Napoleon himself, and he also refused to travel outside France to accept a commission. This required American elite to travel to Paris to sit for him. “Cabanel had the ability to lend his sitters an air of gentility and urbanity, and to give them an aristocratic allure."  C.H Stranahan summarized the appeal of Cabanel's style shortly before his death saying: “…He is especially the master of every grace attractive to woman; great judiciousness in rendering what his subtle reading of the human face gives him; great power and knowledge of hands, which leads to his throwing a veil of mystery over the expression, even leaving a softening vagueness".
 
Upon his death in 1889, “Journals and dailies paid indulgent tribute to Cabanel in obituaries.” In one, he was called “the most distinguished painter of the grand style,” and “all commented on Cabanel’s liberal teaching".

See also
 The Birth of Venus. Other paintings on the same subject.
 The Pearl and the Wave

Notes

References

"CABANEL, Alexandre." Benezit Dictionary of Artists (. "The Fine Arts." The Critic: A Weekly Review of Literature and the Arts (1886-1898) no. 266 (Feb 2, 1889, 1889): 56.

 
Rosenblum, Robert (1989). Paintings in the Musée d'Orsay. New York: Stewart, Tabori & Chang. 

Whiteley, Jon. "Cabanel, Alexandre." Grove Art Online

External links
Alexandre Cabanel. Birth of Venus
Alexandre Cabanel, French, 1823–1889. The Birth of Venus
Cabanal, Alexandre, French, 1824–1889. The Birth of Venus

Birth of Venus, The (Cabanel)
Venus Anadyomenes
Birth of Venus, The
Nude art
Paintings by Alexandre Cabanel
Paintings depicting Greek myths
Paintings of Venus
Musical instruments in art
Water in art